Claudia Ann Wilken (born August 1949) is a senior United States District Court Judge of the United States District Court for the Northern District of California.

Education and career

Born in Minneapolis, Minnesota, Wilken received a Bachelor of Arts degree from Stanford University in 1971 and a Juris Doctor from the University of California, Berkeley School of Law (Boalt Hall) in 1975. She was a Staff attorney of Federal Public Defender's Office, Northern District of California from 1975 to 1978. She was in private practice in Berkeley, California from 1978 to 1984. She was an Adjunct professor, University of California, Boalt Hall School of Law from 1978 to 1984. She was a Professor, New College School of Law from 1980 to 1985.

Federal judicial service

Wilken was nominated by President Bill Clinton on October 7, 1993, to a new seat created by 104 Stat. 5089. She was confirmed by the United States Senate on November 20, 1993, and received her commission on November 22, 1993. She served as chief judge from August 31, 2012 until December 17, 2014, at which time she assumed senior status.

Wilken was formerly a United States magistrate judge for the United States District Court for the Northern District of California, from 1983 to 1993.

Notable cases

In 2014 Wilken ruled against the NCAA in O'Bannon v. NCAA, saying that the organization violated the Sherman Antitrust Act by prohibiting universities from giving student-athletes a share of the revenues earned when their image and personal details were broadcast over television or through other contracts. For this, in 2014 she was named one of ESPNW's Impact 25.

References

Sources

1949 births
Living people
Judges of the United States District Court for the Northern District of California
New College of California faculty
Lawyers from Minneapolis
Stanford University alumni
United States district court judges appointed by Bill Clinton
United States magistrate judges
UC Berkeley School of Law faculty
UC Berkeley School of Law alumni
American women legal scholars
20th-century American judges
21st-century American judges
20th-century American women judges
21st-century American women judges
Public defenders